The William S. Warfield House is a historic house located at 1624 Maine Street in Quincy, Illinois. The house was built in 1886 for William S. Warfield, who founded the Warfield Grocery Co.; Warfield was one of many prominent Quincy residents to build a large house on Maine Street. Architect Joseph Lyman Silsbee designed the house in a blend of the Richardsonian Romanesque and Queen Anne styles; his design popularized Romanesque architecture, and the blend with Queen Anne in particular, in Quincy. The house features a stone exterior with terra cotta decorations, a massive plan, and a large western porch as well as several smaller porches throughout.

The house was added to the National Register of Historic Places on March 21, 1979.

References

Houses on the National Register of Historic Places in Illinois
Queen Anne architecture in Illinois
Richardsonian Romanesque architecture in Illinois
Houses completed in 1886
National Register of Historic Places in Adams County, Illinois
Buildings and structures in Quincy, Illinois
Houses in Adams County, Illinois